is a song by Japanese pop singer Eir Aoi. It was released as thirteenth single digitally on July 17, 2016, and received a physical release on July 20, 2016. It reached number 9 on Oricon and number 5 on Japan Hot 100. It was used as the opening theme song for the second season of anime series The Heroic Legend of Arslan. The song was released before her indefinite hiatus in November 2016, although she would resume her activities in 2018.

Release and reception
On 5 June 2016, the official website of the anime The Heroic Legend of Arslan revealed about the opening theme song for the second season "Tsubasa" that would be sung by Eir Aoi. The song was released digitally on July 17, 2016, and received a physical release on July 20, 2016, on three edition; Regular edition, Limited edition and Limited anime edition. The single reached number 9 on Oricon, 5 on Japan Hot 100, and 2 on Japan Hot Animation with spent 9, 9 and 7 weeks respectively. In August 2016, "Tsubasa" was certified gold by the Recording Industry Association of Japan (RIAJ) for 100,000 full-track ringtone digital music downloads (Chaku Uta Full). The song was featured in her greatest hits album "Best -E-". The single also featured the cover of Do As Infinity song "Fukai Mori".

Music video
The music video for "Tsubasa" was directed by Hideaki Sunaga.  The video features Eir Aoi sing in land when the battlefield is take place, as some scene show some soldier fighting each other. Some scene also show Eir Aoi sing in the castle with some soldiers. Also, some scene show the angel in  a castle, with feather of the wing from the angel spread out, and some scene also show the dragon seen on the battlefield, make the soldiers unite to defeat it. The video end when Eir Aoi stop sing with the angel, the dragon, and the soldiers feature in the scene, with the logo of the song also show in the scene.

Track listing

Regular edition

Limited edition

Limited anime edition

Personnel
Singer and bands
Eir Aoi – vocals, lyrics ("Carry Out")
Uki – lyrics ("Tsubasa")
Hiroo Yamaguchi – bass
Yuya Komoguchi, Tokunaga brothers – guitar
Taro Yoshida – drums
Hitoshi Konno - Violin
 Yusuke Kato – arranger, other instruments

Production
Jun Ozawa, Yoshihiko Ohta – record
Satoshi Morishige, Yoshihiko Ohta – mixer
Hidekazu Sakai – mastering

Charts

Certifications

Release history

References

Eir Aoi songs
2016 singles
Anime songs
2016 songs